Oleksiy Vasylyovych Velychko (born March 30, 1954) is an assistant coach in Arsenal Kyiv. He was a temporary manager for Hoverla in 2015 after the resignation of Vyacheslav Hroznyi.

External links 
Profile at footballfacts.ru
Profile at ukr-football.org.ua

1954 births
Living people
Ukrainian football managers
FC Hoverla Uzhhorod managers
Ukrainian Premier League managers